The Nara (Nera) or Barea (Barya) language is spoken by the Nara people in an area just to the north of Barentu in the Gash-Barka Region of western Eritrea. The language is often confused with Kunama, which is at best only distantly related. 

The endangerment status of Nara is unclear. According to Glottolog it is not endangered, but according to Tsige Hailemichael, the "...Nara language is in danger of quickly disappearing." 

Nara has been classified as Northern Eastern Sudanic by Rilly (2009:2), but Glottolog considers the evidence unpersuasive and classifies Nara as an isolate.

Dialects
There are four Nara dialects according to Rilly (2010:178):

Higir, the standard literary dialect spoken just to the north of Barentu, Eritrea
Mogoreeb, spoken from the outskirts of Haykota to Bisha village in western Eritrea
Saantoorta, spoken to the west of Barentu, Eritrea
Koyta, spoken to the northeast of Barentu, Eritrea

Higir and Mogoreeb are the larger tribes, while Saantoorta and Koyta are smaller tribes (Rilly 2010:178).

References

External links 
 Nara basic lexicon at the Global Lexicostatistical Database

Languages of Eritrea
Northern Eastern Sudanic languages
Language isolates of Africa